This is a season-by-season list of records compiled by Boston College in men's ice hockey.

Boston College has made thirty three appearances in the NCAA Tournament, winning the national title five times.

Season-by-season results

Note: GP = Games played, W = Wins, L = Losses, T = Ties

* Winning percentage is used when conference schedules are unbalanced.† Denver's participation in the 1973 tournament was later vacated.‡ Hockey East did not officially award a conference regular season title in the 2020–21 season, due to scheduling disparities caused by the COVID-19 pandemic.# Notre Dame was forced to withdraw from the 2021 NCAA Tournament due to positive COVID-19 tests; BC advanced automatically.

Footnotes

References

 
Lists of college men's ice hockey seasons in the United States
Boston College Eagles ice hockey seasons